Joan Cusack is an American actress, and comedian.

She has appeared in minor roles in classic films of the 1980s such films as Sixteen Candles (1984), Broadcast News (1987), Working Girl (1988),  and Say Anything... (1989). She continued working in supporting roles in film such as the romantic comedy Nine Months (1995), the thriller Grosse Point Blank (1997), the comedy In & Out (1997), the romantic comedy Runaway Bride (1998), romance High Fidelity (2000), the musical School of Rock (2003), and the coming of age film The Perks of Being a Wallflower (2012). She is also known for her voice as Jessie the Cowgirl in the Pixar animated Toy Story franchise (1999–present) and in Chicken Little (2005), and Arthur Christmas (2011). She also starred in the family films, It's a Very Merry Muppet Christmas Movie (2002), Ice Princess (2003), Looney Tunes: Back in Action (2003, and Kit Kittredge: An American Girl (2008). She is also known as a cast member on Saturday Night Live from 1985 to 1986. She also starred in the Showtime drama series Shameless (2011-2015).

Cusack has been nominated for two Academy Award for Best Supporting Actress for her performances in Mike Nichols' Working Girl (1988) and for the Frank Oz comedy In & Out (1997). She has also received five consecutive Primetime Emmy Award nominations for her performance as Sheila Gallagher in Shameless. She won for the final season.

Main associations

Academy Awards

Golden Globe Awards

Emmy Awards

Miscellaneous awards

References 

Cusack, Joan